Long John Silver is the fictional character from Robert Louis Stevenson's novel Treasure Island

Long John Silver may also refer to:

 Long John Silver (film), a 1954 film starring Robert Newton as the character
 The Adventures of Long John Silver, a 1955 TV series starring Robert Newton as Silver
 Long John Silver's, the restaurant chain
 Long John Silver (album), by Jefferson Airplane
 Long John Silver (comics), a graphic novel series written by Xavier Dorison and illustrated by Mathieu Laufray
 "Long John Silver", a 1996 song by German group Loft

See also
Long john (disambiguation)